You are the Legend (衝出世界) is the official theme song of the 2009 East Asian Games held in Hong Kong. The song was composed by Peter Kam (金培達) and Keith Chan (陳少琪).

Cantonese HK version

Singers
The song was sung by more than 60 performers including singers, celebrities and some athletes.

Athletes

International version
Another international version was also made. It was performed by Dadawa (China PR), Eason Chan (Hong Kong), Kousuke Atari (Japan), Chae Yeon (South Korea), and Richie Ren (Chinese Taipei). The recording began from November 17, 2008.

See also
 We are ready
 2008 Summer Olympics

References

2009 East Asian Games
Chinese songs